Frank McDonnell is a former Irish politician. He briefly served as a Fianna Fáil member of the 18th Seanad. He was nominated by the Taoiseach Charles Haughey, on 26 June 1989, to fill a vacancy after the 1989 general election. He did not contest the 1989 Seanad election.

References

Year of birth missing (living people)
Living people
Fianna Fáil senators
Politicians from Dublin (city)
Members of the 18th Seanad
Nominated members of Seanad Éireann